WQHN (100.9 FM, "The Promise FM") is a radio station in East Jordan, Michigan. Broadcasting a Christian format, the station is owned by Northern Christian Radio.

History
WQHN began broadcasting on June 25, 1989 with the call sign WIZY. Originally owned by Interlochen Center for the Arts, the station changed its call sign to WICV on August 11, 2003. The station was an affiliate of Interlochen Public Radio's "Classical IPR" network.

Effective March 26, 2018, Interlochen Center for the Arts sold WICV to Northern Christian Radio for $150,000, and the station picked up the new owner's "The Promise FM" Christian programming. The station's call sign was changed to WQHN the same day.

References

External links

Michiguide.com - WQHN History

Radio stations established in 1989
1989 establishments in Michigan
QHN